Tuo Kayu Jao Mosque (Indonesian: Old Mosque of Kayu Jao) is an old mosque in Indonesia which is located in Jorong Kayu Jao, Batang Barus Nagari, Gunung Talang District, Solok Regency, West Sumatra. Existence of the mosque was already recorded since 1599, making it the oldest mosque in Solok Regency and among the oldest surviving mosques in Indonesia.

The mosque is registered on the list of heritages in West Sumatra which is overseen by the Preservation Hall of Ancient Relics. The mosque has been restored several times, including the restoration of one of the pillars and replacement of the old palm roof with a new one due to its erosion. Even undergoing those restorations, however, the authenticity of the mosque is well-preserved.

History 

It is not known exactly what year the mosque was actually completed. Based on a number of records, the mosque is considered built in 1599, while other records show older dates. Apart from these differences, it is known that the construction of the mosque was made following the proliferation of Islam in the Solok region in the 16th century. Nagari where the mosque is located has been previously established by the three leaderships of the Minangkabau community. According to the local community leaders, there are two people who played a role in the construction of this mosque, namely Angku Musaur and Angku Labai, both of which are buried not far from the mosque.

See also 

 List of mosques in Indonesia

References 
 Footnotes

 Bibliography

External links 
 Masjid Tuo Kayu Jao The official website of the West Sumatra provincial government

16th-century mosques
Buildings and structures in West Sumatra
Cultural Properties of Indonesia in West Sumatra
Minangkabau
Mosques in Indonesia
Tourist attractions in West Sumatra